The Quarter Pony is a breed of pony that is similar to the American Quarter Horse. The breed was originally developed from Quarter Horses that did not meet the American Quarter Horse Association's height requirement. It is bred to look like a small Quarter Horse, although the various registries also allow crosses with other breeds, including Paint horse, Appaloosa and Pony of the Americas, all stock types. It is one of the most versatile horse breeds there are. There are three registries for the Quarter Pony, all with slightly different registration requirements. The first registry was begun in 1964, and two more were started in the 1970s. The breed is used today in a variety of Western and English riding disciplines.

Characteristics

The Quarter Pony is bred to be an American Quarter Horse built on a smaller scale. Depending on the registry, the Quarter Pony may come in any color or combination or colors, including pinto patterns such as tobiano and overo and spotted Appaloosa patterns. In the early years of the breed, only solid colors were allowed. The breed has a short, broad head with small ears and wide-set eyes, set on a slightly arched neck. The shoulders are sloping, the withers sharp, the chest broad and deep. The back is short and the hindquarters broad and deep.

Quarter Ponies are often used in western riding activities as mounts for children because of their small size, and calm, even temperament. Larger ponies are more suitable for adult riders and sometimes used for rodeo events such as steer wrestling.

The Quarter Pony is recognized by several different breed registries that each have different requirements. The American Quarter Pony Association requires that, although parentage may be unknown, the pony must have conformation that is desirable for breeding and be easily recognizable as having Quarter Pony or Quarter Horse breeding. pinto, leopard complex (Appaloosa), and white horses are not eligible for registration, nor are gaited ponies. The National Quarter Pony Association requires that stallions be registered with the AQHA before they can be registered with the NQPA. Mares must have one parent registered with the AQHA, be registered with the AQHA themselves, or go through a special registration process. Geldings simply have to be of Quarter Horse type to be eligible for registration. Horses with Pinto or Appaloosa markings, or with excessive white, are not eligible for registration. The International Quarter Pony Association allows Pinto and Appaloosa markings, and simply requires that ponies be of Quarter-type conformation and good disposition for registry. Any type of pony meeting these requirements may be registered through the hardship registration program, which includes a special inspection. However, if ponies have a parent registered with an approved breed registry (approved breeds include the Quarter Pony, Quarter Horse, Paint horse, Appaloosa and Pony of the Americas), they are automatically eligible for registration, with no inspection required. Crosses with gaited breeds are not accepted for registration.

History

This height requirement was later removed, but the Quarter Pony breed continued. Breeders and registries encourage known bloodlines from Quarter Horses, but these are not required by all registries.

The American Quarter Pony Association was begun in 1964 with the ideals of a registry which would register small horses and ponies of western type, whose breeding could be unknown but which were desirable for breeding purposes. Crossbred and purebred animals are eligible for registration, as are animals registered with other registries that meet the entry requirements. In 1975, the National Quarter Pony Association was begun to preserve the smaller, stockier type Quarter Horse when breeding trends were leaning towards taller, leaner animals. The AQPA now registers horses in several foreign countries, as well as all US states and Canadian provinces. The International Quarter Pony Association, begun in the 1970s, also registers Quarter Ponies, and is a worldwide association for ponies of Quarter Horse type. The Quarter Pony Association is an association affiliated with the International Quarter Pony Association, with the goal of promoting the Quarter Pony. In 2005, the IQPA and the QPA became one organization, with the IQPA acting as the registry and the QPA as the membership branch. As of 2005, there were an estimated 3,000 Quarter Ponies registered with all registering organizations. Registries say that registrations of adult animals outnumber those for foals every year, as many owners wait until the pony is old enough to be shown under saddle before registering them.

References

External links

 American Quarter Pony Association
 National Quarter Pony Association
 International Quarter Pony Association
 Quarter Pony Association

Horse breeds
Horse breeds originating in the United States